Intracrine refers to a hormone that acts inside a cell, regulating intracellular events. In simple terms it means that the cell stimulates itself by cellular production of a factor that acts within the cell. Steroid hormones act through intracellular (mostly nuclear) receptors and, thus, may be considered to be intracrines. In contrast, peptide or protein hormones, in general, act as endocrines, autocrines, or paracrines by binding to their receptors present on the cell surface. Several peptide/protein hormones or their isoforms also act inside the cell through different mechanisms. These peptide/protein hormones, which have intracellular functions, are also called intracrines. The term 'intracrine' is thought to have been coined to represent peptide/protein hormones that also have intracellular actions. To better understand intracrine, we can compare it to paracrine, autocrine and endocrine. The autocrine system deals with the autocrine receptors of a cell allowing for the hormones to bind, which have been secreted from that same cell. The paracrine system is one where nearby cells get hormones from a cell, and change the functioning of those nearby cells. The endocrine system refers to when the hormones from a cell affect another cell that is very distant from the one that released the hormone.

Paracrine physiology has been understood for decades now and the effects of paracrine hormones have been observed when for example, an obesity associate tumor will face the effects of local adipocytes, even if it is not in direct contact with the fat pads in concern. Endocrine physiology on the other hand is a growing field and has had a new area explored, called intracrinology. In intracrinology, the sex steroids produced locally, exert their action in the same cell where they are produced.

The biological effects produced by intracellular actions are referred as intracrine effects, whereas those produced by binding to cell surface receptors are called endocrine, autocrine, or paracrine effects, depending on the origin of the hormone. The intracrine effect of some of the peptide/protein hormones are similar to their endocrine, autocrine, or paracrine effects; however, these effects are different for some other hormones.

Intracrine can also refer to a hormone acting within the cell that synthesizes it.

Examples of intracrine peptide hormones: There are several protein/peptide hormones that are also intracrines. Notable examples that have been described in the references include:
 Peptides of the renin–angiotensin system: angiotensin II and angiotensin (1-7)
 Fibroblast growth factor 2
 Parathyroid hormone-related protein

See also
 Local hormone
 Autocrine signalling

References

 Park, Jiyoung; Euhus, David M.; Scherer, Philipp E. (August 2011). "Paracrine and Endocrine Effects of Adipose Tissue on Cancer Development and Progression". Endocrine Reviews. 32 (4): 550–570. .
 Labrie, Fernand; Luu-The, Van; Labrie, Claude; Bélanger, Alain; Simard, Jacques; Lin, Sheng-Xiang; Pelletier, Georges (April 2003). "Endocrine and Intracrine Sources of Androgens in Women: Inhibition of Breast Cancer and Other Roles of Androgens and Their Precursor Dehydroepiandrosterone". Endocrine Reviews. 24 (2): 152–182. .
 
  
  
 
 

Specific

Cell biology